David Lapin (born October 30, 1949) is a South African born rabbi, since 2019 rabbi of KBA, Raanana, Israel, and an international leadership and strategy consultant.

Early life and education
Lapin is the son of Rabbi A H Lapin, a Rabbinic leader of South Africa. Lapin studied under his great uncle Rabbi Eliyahu Lopian (1876–1970) (also known as Reb Elyah), a rabbi of the Mussar Movement. Lapin was a student of Rabbi Avrohom Gurwicz at Gateshead Yeshiva, Rabbi Mishkowski at Kefar Hassidim and Rabbi Haim Shmuelewitz at Mir Yeshiva in Jerusalem. He gained his smicha from Rabbi Isser Yehudah Unterman, the Chief Rabbi of Israel.

Career
In 1989 Lapin founded the South African Institute of Business Ethics (SAIBE), whose purpose was to raise the standard of business ethics in South Africa and to position the orthodox Jewish voice as an influential ethical force in the corporate world.  In this capacity, Rabbi Lapin authored the Code of Ethics for Southern African Enterprises which was adopted by the first King Commission on Corporate Governance. SAIBE later developed into a consulting firm, Strategic Business Ethics Inc. now known as Lapin Consulting International Inc. of which Rabbi Lapin is the CEO.

In 1997 David Lapin emigrated to the USA and in November 2012 was considered by The United Synagogue as a late entrant candidate in the selection process to succeed Rabbi Dr. Jonathan Sacks as Chief Rabbi of the United Kingdom, a role which was then given to Ephraim Mirvis.

In 2019 Lapin moved to Raanana Israel where he leads a community in Raanana and continues to consult globally. Lapin International is still headquartered in the USA where most of its clients are.

Family

Rabbi Daniel Lapin is the older brother, and Rabbi Raphael Lapin is the younger brother, of David Lapin, their sister is Rebbetzin Judith Chill . Their father was the notable South African Rabbi Avraham Hyam Lapin (1912–1991)  who was a nephew of Rabbi Elyah Lopian (1876–1970). Rabbi Lapin is married and has five children, four daughters and a son residing in the USA, Canada and Israel.

Publications 

Lead By Greatness: How Character Can Power Your Success (2012)

References 

1949 births
Living people
South African Orthodox rabbis